Daisy cutter may refer to:

 Daisy cutter (fuse), a type of fuse designed to detonate an aerial bomb at or above ground level
 BLU-82, a type of bomb nicknamed Daisy Cutter in Vietnam
 In cricket, a ball that bounces multiple times before reaching the batsman
 A seldom used term for a sharply struck ground ball in baseball, used mostly in Vintage base ball
 A song on the album Uplifter by 311
 A pale ale brewed by Half Acre Beer Company of Chicago, Illinois